Lee Wei (born 9 July 1980) is a Taiwanese actor and singer.

Filmography

Movies

Television Dramas

Discography

References

1980 births
Living people
Male actors from Taipei
Taiwanese male film actors
Taiwanese male television actors
Taiwanese Mandopop singers
Musicians from Taipei
Taiwanese male novelists
21st-century Taiwanese  male singers